Charles Nduwuisi Ondo (born 22 October 2003) is a Spanish-Equatorial Guinean professional footballer who plays as a defender or forward for League of Ireland First Division club Waterford, on loan from English club Huddersfield Town.

Early life
Ondo was born in Madrid, Spain and moved to England at a young age. He was born to a Nigerian father and an Equatorial Guinean mother.

Club career
Ondo is a youth product of Millwall starting at U8 levels, and moved to Huddersfield Town's you side in 2020. He was promoted to Huddersfield Town's B-team shortly after, and signed his first professional contract with the club on 25 February 2022 until 2023. and was first called up to their senior side in October 2022. He made his professional and EFL Championship debut as a late substitute with Huddersfield Town in a 2–0 win to Hull City on 9 October 2022.

On 15 February 2023, Ondo signed for League of Ireland First Division club Waterford on loan.

International career
On 9 March 2023, Ondo was called up to the Equatorial Guinea national football team for their Africa Cup of Nations qualifiers against Botswana.

Playing style
Ondo is a versatile footballer, who can play as left-back, centre-back and striker.

References

External links

2003 births
Living people
Footballers from Madrid
Spanish footballers
Association football fullbacks
Association football defenders
Association football forwards
Huddersfield Town A.F.C. players
Waterford F.C. players
English Football League players
League of Ireland players
Spanish expatriate footballers
Spanish expatriates in England
Expatriate footballers in England
Spanish people of Nigerian descent
Spanish sportspeople of African descent
Spanish sportspeople of Equatoguinean descent
Expatriate association footballers in the Republic of Ireland